The 2017 Women's Masters Basel was a curling tournament held from October 5 to 9 the Curlingzentrum Region Basel in Basel, Switzerland as part of the 2017–18 World Curling Tour. The event was held in a triple-knockout format.

Teams
The teams are listed as follows:

Knockout results
The draw is listed as follows:

A event

B event

C event

Playoffs

References

External links

2017 in women's curling
Women's curling competitions in Switzerland
Sports competitions in Basel
2017 in Swiss women's sport
October 2017 sports events in Europe
21st century in Basel